Edward Montagu (1672–1710) was an English politician, elected as Member of Parliament for Chippenham in 1698. His kinsman Alexander Popham, one of the two Chippenham Members since 1690, in 1698 stood instead in Bath, making way for Montagu.

References

1672 births
1710 deaths
English MPs 1698–1700
People from Chippenham
Place of birth missing